Jorge Arias (born 24 September 1972) is a Peruvian swimmer. He competed in the men's 100 metre breaststroke event at the 1996 Summer Olympics.

References

External links
 

1972 births
Living people
Peruvian male breaststroke swimmers
Olympic swimmers of Peru
Swimmers at the 1996 Summer Olympics